Manges (Greek: μάγκες ; sing.: mangas , μάγκας ) is the name of a social group in the Belle Époque era's counterculture of Greece (especially of the great urban centers: Athens, Piraeus, and Thessaloniki). The nearest English equivalent to the term "mangas" is wide boy, or spiv.

Overview
Mangas was a label for men belonging to the Greek working class, behaving in a particularly arrogant/presumptuous way, and dressing with a very typical vesture composed of a woolen hat (kavouraki, καβουράκι), a jacket (they usually wore only one of its sleeves), a tight belt (used as a knife case), stripe pants, and pointy shoes. Other features of their appearance were their long moustache, their bead chaplets (κομπολόγια, sing. κομπολόι), and their idiosyncratic manneristic limp-walking (κουτσό βάδισμα). A related social group were the Koutsavakides (κουτσαβάκηδες, sing. κουτσαβάκης); the two terms are occasionally used interchangeably. Manges are also notable for being closely associated to the history of rebetiko.

Etymology
The three most probable etymologies of the word Mangas are the following:
 From the Turkish manga "small military troop" via Albanian mangë.
 From the Latin manica (from the same root as Modern Greek μανίκι "sleeve") "hand-related" (cf. the sound change from the Latin manicus to the Spanish mango "handle").
 According to a more marginal proposal, its origin is from the Latin mango, -onis "dealer, trader".

In popular culture
Most rebetiko songs refer to manges, even when this is not explicit, as rebetiko was part of this subculture. Examples are: "Στην Υπόγα" ("In the Basement", by Kostis, 1930), "Ο Μάγκας του Βοτανικού" ("The Mangas of Votanikos", by Kasimatis, 1934). The admiration of manges was carried on with the later genre of greek music Laïko. Examples are: "Πού 'σουν μάγκα το Χειμώνα" ("Where Were You, Mangas, During the Winter", by Giorgos Mouflezis, 70s), and others. 

Karagiozis shadow plays portray a recurrent character called Stavrakas, Σταύρακας.

In modern Greek language, mangas has become a synonym for "swash guy, swagger" or (in dialogue) simply "dude"; depending on context it may have more negative ("bully, henchman, hooligan") or more positive ("brave, crafty man") connotations.

Notes

Notes and references

Bibliography
See also the bibliography sections on rebetiko and rebetes, much of which also deal with the lifestyle of manges.
 Stasinopoulos, Epaminondas. Η Αθήνα του περασμένου αιώνα (1830–1900) – Last Century's Athens (1830–1900), Athens, 1963 .

Greek culture
Counterculture
Belle Époque
Working class in Europe